Miketz or Mikeitz (—Hebrew for "at the end", the second word, and first distinctive word of the parashah) is the tenth weekly Torah portion (parashah) in the annual Jewish cycle of Torah reading. It constitutes . The parashah tells of Joseph's interpretation of Pharaoh's dreams, Joseph's rise to power in Egypt, and Joseph's testing of his brothers.

The parashah has the most letters (although not the most words or verses) of any of the weekly Torah portions in the Book of Genesis. It is made up of 7,914 Hebrew letters, 2,022 Hebrew words, 146 verses, and 255 lines in a Torah Scroll (Sefer Torah). (In the Book of Genesis, Parashat Vayeira has the most words, and Parashiyot Noach and Vayishlach have the most verses.) Jews read Parashat Miketz on the tenth Sabbath after Simchat Torah, generally in December, or rarely in late November or early January, usually during Chanukah.

Readings
In the Masoretic Text of the Tanakh (Hebrew Bible), Parashat Miketz has no "open portion" (petuchah) divisions (roughly equivalent to paragraphs, often abbreviated with the Hebrew letter  (peh)). Parashat Miketz has a single "closed portion" (setumah) division (abbreviated with the Hebrew letter  (samekh)) at the close of the parashah. Thus, the Masoretic Text treats the parashah as one continuous whole.

First reading – Genesis 41:1–14
In the first reading, Pharaoh dreamed that he stood by the river, and out came seven fat cattle, who fed in the reed-grass. And then seven lean cattle came up out of the river and ate the seven fat cattle, and Pharaoh awoke. He went back to sleep and dreamed that seven good ears of corn came up on one stalk, and then seven thin ears sprung up after them and swallowed the good ears, and Pharaoh again awoke. In the morning, Pharaoh was troubled and sent for all the magicians and wise men of Egypt and told them his dream, but none could interpret it. Then the chief butler spoke up, confessing his faults and relating how Pharaoh had put him in prison with the baker, and a Hebrew there had interpreted their dreams, correctly predicting the future. Pharaoh sent for Joseph, who shaved, changed clothes, and came to Pharaoh. The first reading ends here.

Second reading – Genesis 41:15–38
In the second reading, Pharaoh told Joseph that he had had a dream that none could interpret and had heard that Joseph could interpret dreams, but Joseph said that God would give Pharaoh an answer. Pharaoh told Joseph his dreams, and Joseph told him that the two dreams were one, a prediction of what God was about to do. The seven good cattle and the seven good ears symbolized seven years of plenty, and the seven lean cattle and the seven empty ears symbolized seven years of famine that would consume thereafter. The dream was doubled because God had established the thing and would shortly bring it to pass. Joseph recommended that Pharaoh set over Egypt a man discreet and wise, that he appoint overseers to take up a fifth of the harvests during the years of plenty, and that he store that food for the years of famine. Pharaoh agreed, asking whether anyone could find a man such as Joseph in whom the spirit of God was. The second reading ends here.

Third reading—Genesis 41:39–52
In the third reading, Pharaoh told Joseph that in as much as God had shown him all this, there was none so discreet and wise as Joseph, and thus Pharaoh set Joseph over all the land of Egypt. Pharaoh gave Joseph his signet ring, fine linen, a gold chain about his neck, and his 2nd chariot, and had people cry "Abrech" before him. And Pharaoh renamed Joseph Zaphenath-paneah and gave him Asenath the daughter of Potipherah priest of On to be his wife. Joseph was 30 years old when he stood before Pharaoh, and in the seven years of plenty he gathered up grain as plentiful as the sand of the sea. Joseph and Asenath had two sons, the first of whom Joseph called Manasseh, for God had made him forget all his toil and all his father's house, and the second of whom he called Ephraim, for God had made him fruitful in the land of his affliction. The third reading ends here.

Fourth reading – Genesis 41:53–42:18
In the fourth reading, the seven years of plenty ended and famine struck, and when Egypt was famished, Joseph opened the storehouses and sold food to the Egyptians. People from all countries came to Egypt to buy grain, because the famine struck all the earth. Jacob saw that there was grain in Egypt, asked his sons why they sat around looking at each other, and sent them down to Egypt to buy some. Ten of Joseph's brothers went down to Egypt, but Jacob kept Benjamin behind, so that no harm would befall him. Joseph's brothers came to buy grain from Joseph and bowed down to him with their faces to the earth. Joseph recognized his brothers, but they did not recognize him, for he made himself strange to them and spoke roughly with them. Joseph remembered his dreams, and accused them of being spies. But they protested that they were not spies, but upright men come to buy food, ten sons of a man who had twelve sons, lost one, and kept one behind. Joseph told them that to prove their story, they would have to send one of them to fetch their brother, and he imprisoned them for three days. On the third day, Joseph proposed a plan to them, because he feared God. The fourth reading ends here.

Fifth reading—Genesis 42:19–43:15
In the long fifth reading, Joseph told his brothers that he would allow them to prove themselves by letting one of them be bound in prison while the others carried grain to their houses and brought their youngest brother to Egypt. They said to one another that surely they were guilty concerning their brother, and so now this distress had come upon them. Reuben said that he had told them not to sin against their brother, but they had not listened. They did not realize that Joseph understood them, for he used an interpreter, and Joseph turned aside and wept. When Joseph returned, he bound Simeon before their eyes, and commanded that their vessels be filled with grain and that their money be restored to their sacks. They loaded their donkeys and departed. When they came to a lodging-place, one of them opened his sack and found his money, and their spirits fell, wondering what God had done to them. They went home and told Jacob what had happened, and Jacob accused them of bereaving him of his children, first Joseph and now Simeon, and told them that they would not take Benjamin away. Reuben answered that Jacob could kill Reuben's two sons if Reuben failed to bring Benjamin back, but Jacob insisted that his son would not go down with them, for Joseph was dead and only Benjamin was left, and if harm befell Benjamin then it would be the death of Jacob. The famine continued, and Jacob told the brothers to buy more grain. Judah reminded Jacob that the man had warned them that they could not see his face unless their brother came with them, so if Jacob sent their brother Benjamin they could buy food, but if Jacob did not send him they could not go. Jacob asked them why they had treated him so ill as to tell the man that they had a brother. They explained that the man asked them directly about their family, whether their father was alive, and whether they had another brother, and they answered him; how were they to know that he would ask them to bring their brother? Judah then asked Jacob to send the lad with him, so that they could go and the family could live, and Judah would serve as surety for him, for they could have been to Egypt and back if they had not lingered. Relenting, Jacob directed them to take a present for the man, double money in case the return of their payment was an oversight, and also their brother, and Jacob prayed that God might show them mercy before the man and that he might release Simeon and Benjamin. So the brothers went to Joseph. The fifth reading ends here.

Sixth reading—Genesis 43:16–29
In the sixth reading, when Joseph saw Benjamin with them, he directed his steward to bring the men into the house and prepare a meal for him to eat with them at noon. When the brothers were conducted into Joseph's house, they grew afraid that Joseph was going to hold them as bondmen because they had taken the money that they found in their sacks. So they explained to Joseph's steward how they had discovered their money returned to them and had brought it back with them, plus more money to buy grain. But the steward told them not to fear, for their God had given them treasure in their sacks; he had their money. The steward brought Simeon out, brought them into Joseph's house, gave them water, and fed their donkeys. When Joseph came home, they brought their present and bowed down to him. Joseph asked about their and of their father's welfare. They said that Joseph's servant their father was well, and they bowed their heads. Joseph looked upon Benjamin and asked them whether this was their youngest brother of whom they had spoken, and he prayed that God would be gracious to Benjamin. The sixth reading ends here.

Seventh reading—Genesis 43:30–44:17
In the seventh reading, Joseph left hastily for his chamber and wept, washed his face, returned, and called for the servants to serve the meal. Joseph sat by himself, the brothers sat by themselves, and the Egyptians sat by themselves, because it was an abomination to the Egyptians to eat with the Hebrews. The brothers marveled that the servants had seated them according to their age. And Benjamin's portion was five times so much as any of his brothers'. Joseph directed the steward to fill the men's sacks with as much food as they could carry, put every man's money in his sack, and put Joseph's silver goblet in the youngest one's sack. At dawn, the brothers were sent away, but when they had not yet gone far from the city, Joseph directed his steward to overtake them and ask them why they had rewarded evil for good and taken the goblet with which Joseph drank and divined. They asked the steward why he accused them, as they had brought back the money that they had found in their sacks, and they volunteered that the one with whom the goblet was found would die, and the brothers would become bondmen. The steward agreed, with the amendment that the one with whom it was found would be a bondman and the others would go free. Hastily, every man opened his sack, starting with the eldest, and they found the goblet in Benjamin's sack. They rent their clothes, loaded their donkeys, and returned to the city.

In the maftir reading that concludes the parashah, Judah and his brothers came to Joseph's house and fell before him on the ground. Joseph asked them what they had done, did they not know that a man such as he would divine? Judah asked how they could clear themselves when God had found out their iniquity; they were all Joseph's bondmen. But Joseph insisted that only the man in whose hand the goblet was found would be his bondman, and the others could go in peace to their father. The seventh reading, the single closed portion, and the parashah end here.

Readings according to the triennial cycle
Jews who read the Torah according to the triennial cycle of Torah reading read the parashah according to the following schedule:

In ancient parallels
The parashah has parallels in these ancient sources:

Genesis chapter 41
Gerhard von Rad argued that the Joseph narrative is closely related to earlier Egyptian wisdom writings. Von Rad likened Joseph's actions (for example in ) to the admonition of Ptahhotep (an Egyptian vizier during the late 25th and early 24th centuries BCE): "If you are a tried counselor who sits in the hall of his lord, gather your wits together right well. When you are silent, it will be better than tef-tef flowers. When you speak, you must know how to bring the matter to a conclusion. The one who gives counsel is an accomplished man; to speak is harder than any labor."

In inner-Biblical interpretation
The parashah has parallels or is discussed in these Biblical sources:

Genesis chapter 41
He shall stand before kings; he shall not stand before mean men."

Genesis chapter 42

In early nonrabbinic interpretation
The parashah has parallels or is discussed in these early nonrabbinic sources:

Genesis chapter 44
Philo observed that having attained authority and presented with the opportunity for revenge for the ill-treatment that he had received, Joseph nonetheless bore what happened with self-restraint and governed himself.

In classical rabbinic interpretation
The parashah is discussed in these rabbinic sources from the era of the Mishnah and the Talmud:

Genesis chapter 41
The Gemara noted that the words "two years of days (yamim)" in  means two years.

The Midrash answered that while it is true that all people dream, a king's dream affects the whole world.

The Gemara taught that a dream is a sixtieth part of prophecy. Rabbi Ḥanan taught that even if the Master of Dreams (an angel, in a dream that truly foretells the future) tells a person that on the next day the person will die, the person should not desist from prayer, for as  says, "For in the multitude of dreams are vanities and also many words, but fear God." (Although a dream may seem reliably to predict the future, it will not necessarily come true; one must place one's trust in God.) Rabbi Samuel bar Naḥmani said in the name of Rabbi Jonathan that a person is shown in a dream only what is suggested by the person's own thoughts (while awake), as  says, "As for you, Oh King, your thoughts came into your mind upon your bed", and  says, "That you may know the thoughts of the heart." When Samuel had a bad dream, he used to quote , "The dreams speak falsely." The Gemara resolved the contradiction, teaching that , "I speak with him in a dream?" refers to dreams that come through an angel, whereas , "The dreams speak falsely", refers to dreams that come through a demon.

Rabbi Joḥanan taught that the wicked stand over their gods, as  says, "And Pharaoh dreamed, and, behold, he stood over the river." (The Egyptians worshipped the Nile as a god.) But God stands over them, as  says, "and, behold, the Lord stood over him." (Thus, idolaters must stand over and protect their idols, but God protects God's people.)

Rabbi Judah explained that Pharaoh's "spirit was troubled" in  because he wanted the interpretation of his dreams.

Reading in  that Pharaoh "sent and called for all the magicians of Egypt ... but there was none that could interpret them for Pharaoh", Rabbi Joshua of Siknin taught in Rabbi Levi's name that there were indeed interpreters of the dream, but their interpretations were unacceptable to Pharaoh (and thus "there were none ... for Pharaoh"). For example, the magicians said that the seven good cows meant that Pharaoh would have seven daughters and the seven ill-favored cows meant that Pharaoh would bury seven daughters. They told Pharaoh that the seven full ears of corn meant that Pharaoh would conquer seven provinces and the seven thin ears meant that seven provinces would revolt against him.

And God grants each nation wisdom, understanding, and strength. When God judges the world, God takes these things away from the nation that God punishes, as  says, Shall I not in that day', says the Lord, 'destroy the wise men out of Edom, and discernment [understanding] out of the mount of Esau? And your mighty men, O Teman, shall be dismayed—broken. The Midrash taught that the purpose of all this sending for and failing of magicians was so that Joseph might come at the end and be raised to high rank. God saw that if Joseph came at the beginning and interpreted the dream, Joseph would gain little praise, for the magicians would be able to say that had one asked them, we would have interpreted the dream long before. Therefore, God waited until the magicians had wearied and had exhausted Pharaoh's spirit, and then Joseph came and restored it.

Rabbi Bana'ah argued that the import – and potential prophetic nature – of a dream on the waking world follows its interpretation.

Reading , "And Joseph shaved himself and changed his clothes", a Midrash taught that cutting his hair improved his appearance and made him look handsome.

A Midrash taught that "Joseph shaved himself and changed his clothes" (as reported in ) out of respect for royalty.

Rabbi Joḥanan said that three kinds of dreams are fulfilled: A dream of the morning, a dream that one's friend dreamed about one, and a dream that is interpreted within a dream. And some say that a dream that is repeated several times is also fulfilled, as  says: "And for that the dream was doubled unto Pharaoh twice, it is because the thing is established by God, and God will shortly bring it to pass."

But Joseph replied that this was not what Pharaoh had seen, for they were (in the words of ) "well-favored and fat-fleshed" (yifot mareh, uvriot basar). But Joseph replied that this was not what Pharaoh had seen, for they were (in the words of ) "ill favored and lean-fleshed" (raot mareh, vedakot basar). But Joseph replied that this was not what Pharaoh had seen, for they were (in the words of ) "healthy [, beriot] and good". But Joseph replied that this was not what Pharaoh had seen, for they were (in the words of ) "thin and blasted with the east wind" (dakot u-shedufot kadim). Pharaoh began to wonder, and told Joseph that Joseph must have been behind Pharaoh when he dreamed, as  says, "Forasmuch as God has shown you all this."

The Pirke De-Rabbi Eliezer taught that the Holy Spirit rested upon Joseph, enabling him to interpret Pharaoh's dream, as  reports, "And Pharaoh said to his servants, 'Can we find such a one as this, a man in whom the spirit of God is?

Reading , "And he made him ride in his double chariot", a Baraita in the Jerusalem Talmud deduced that at first, only two horses pulled chariots. And the Baraita further reported that the Roman Empire made chariots drawn by four horses.

The Pirke De-Rabbi Eliezer taught that when Joseph rode in his chariot (as described in ), the Egyptian girls climbed up the walls to see him and threw him rings of gold so that he might look at them and they could see the beauty of his figure.

Rabbi Ḥiyya bar Abba taught in the name of Rabbi Joḥanan that when in  Pharaoh conferred power on Joseph, Pharaoh's astrologers questioned whether Pharaoh would set in power over them a slave whom his master bought for 20 pieces of silver. Pharaoh replied to them that he discerned royal characteristics in Joseph. Pharaoh's astrologers said to Pharaoh that in that case, Joseph must be able to speak the 70 languages of the world. That night, the angel Gabriel came to teach Joseph the 70 languages, but Joseph could not learn them. Thereupon Gabriel added a letter from God's Name to Joseph's name, and Joseph was able to learn the languages, as Psalm  reports, "He appointed it in Joseph for a testimony, when he went out over the land of Egypt, where I (Joseph) heard a language that I knew not." The next day, in whatever language Pharaoh spoke to Joseph, Joseph was able to reply to Pharaoh. But when Joseph spoke to Pharaoh in Hebrew, Pharaoh did not understand what he said. So Pharaoh asked Joseph to teach it to him. Joseph tried to teach Pharaoh Hebrew, but Pharaoh could not learn it. Pharaoh asked Joseph to swear that he would not reveal his failing, and Joseph swore. But Joseph replied that in that case, he would also ask to be released from his oath to Pharaoh concerning Pharaoh's ignorance of languages.

Reading , "He placed food in the cities; the food that came from a city's surrounding fields he placed in its midst", Rabbi Judah taught that Joseph stored the crops of Tiberias in Tiberias, and the crops of Sepphoris in Sepphoris, so that every region preserved its own produce. Rabbi Judah thus argued that Joseph increased efficiency by decentralizing food distribution. The Rabbis observed that if all the citizens of Tiberias consumed the produce grown in Tiberias, and all the citizens of Sepphoris consumed the produce grown in Sepphoris, then they would not get a handful each. The Rabbis concluded that a blessing rested on the stored produce, for there was enough for all.

Resh Lakish deduced from the words, "And to Joseph were born two sons before the year of famine came", in  that Joseph did not have marital relations during the famine, and generalized that no man should. The Gemara qualified the injunction, however, teaching that childless people may have marital relations in years of famine. Similarly, reading , "And to Joseph were born two sons", Rabbi Muna and Rav Huna taught that this occurred before the famine came.

The Midrash taught that God rewarded Joseph for resisting Potiphar's wife by making him ruler (hashalit) over the land of Egypt (as reported in ). The Midrash taught that Joseph received so much honor because he observed the commandments, as  teaches when it says, "Whoever keeps the commandment shall know no evil thing."

A Midrash told that when the famine became severe in Egypt, the Egyptians cried out to Joseph for bread. Joseph told them to circumcise themselves first. They cried out to Pharaoh, as  reports, and Pharaoh told them to go to Joseph. The people complained that Joseph asked them to circumcise themselves, and they complained that it was not fitting for a Hebrew to wield power over Egyptians. Calling them fools, Pharaoh recalled that during the years of plenty, a herald had continually proclaimed that a famine was coming, and asked why they had not saved grain in reserve. The people replied that all the grain that they had left had rotted. Pharaoh asked them whether any flour was left from the day before. The people replied that even the bread in their baskets had gone moldy. Pharaoh answered that if grain rotted at Joseph's decree, perhaps he might decree that the Egyptians die. So Pharaoh directed them to go to Joseph and obey him, even if he told them to cut off something of their flesh.

Reading , "And the famine was over all the face of the earth", a Midrash asked why the text did not simply say, "And the famine was over the earth." Rabbi Samuel ben Naḥman answered that  teaches that the famine began with the wealthy, for the expression "the face of the earth" refers to the wealthy. The wealthy have a smiling face to show their friends, but the poor hide their face in embarrassment.

Rav Judah in the name of Samuel deduced from  that Joseph gathered in and brought to Egypt all the gold and silver in the world. The Gemara noted that  says: "And Joseph gathered up all the money that was found in the land of Egypt, and in the land of Canaan", and thus spoke about the wealth of only Egypt and Canaan. The Gemara deduced from the words "and they despoiled the Egyptians" in  that when the Israelites left Egypt, they carried that wealth away with them. The Gemara then taught that the wealth lay in Israel until the time of King Rehoboam, when King Shishak of Egypt seized it from Rehoboam, as 1 Kings  reports: "And it came to pass in the fifth year of king Rehoboam, that Shishak king of Egypt came up against Jerusalem; and he took away the treasures of the house of the Lord, and the treasures of the king's house." Similarly, the Avot of Rabbi Natan cited  for the proposition that the silver of Egypt thus returned to its place of origin in Egypt.

Genesis chapter 42
Similarly, Resh Lakish taught that , "whose hope [, sivro] is in the Lord his God", refers to Joseph, who was the hope for the entire world when he was in Egypt. And God showed Jacob that his hope (sivro) was in Egypt, as  can be read, "Now Jacob saw that there was hope [, sever] in Egypt."

The Sages read  to teach that Jacob warned his sons against appearing well fed when others around them were without food. The Sages taught that if one fasted on account of some trouble and it passed, or for a sick person and the sick person recovered, then the one fasting should nevertheless complete the fast. If one journeyed from a place where they were not fasting to a place where they were, then one should fast with the people of the new place. If one journeyed from a place where they were fasting to a place where they were not, then one should nevertheless complete the fast. If one forgot and ate and drank, then one should not make it apparent in public nor indulge in luxuries. For the Sages read  to say, "And Jacob said to his sons: 'Why should you show yourself? Thus, the Sages taught, Jacob conveyed to his sons: "When you are fully sated, do not show yourselves either before Esau or before Ishmael, so that they should not envy you." Similarly, a Midrash read  to say, "And Jacob said to his sons: 'Why should you be conspicuous? The Midrash interpreted  to mean that Jacob told his sons that they were all strong and brotherly; they were not to enter through one gate and all stand in the same place, so that they should not tempt the evil eye.

Similarly, a Midrash taught that Jacob asked his sons not to go out with food in their hands, or with weapons, and not to show themselves to be well fed, lest neighbors come and wage war against Jacob.

Rava said that Rav Sheshet read  to teach that one who teaches Torah will receive blessings like Joseph. For  (which the Gemara read to allude to teaching Torah) says, "But blessing shall be upon the head of one who provides (mashbir) [Torah]," and  uses the same word "provide" (mashbir) to refer to Joseph when it says, "And Joseph was the governor of the land, and he was the provider (ha-mashbir) to all the people of the land."

Reading , Rav Ḥisda explained that Joseph's brothers did not recognize him because when they last saw him, he did not yet have a full beard, and he did have a full beard when his brothers saw him in Egypt, demonstrating that people's appearance can change so much over time that even their own family may not recognize them.

The Pirke De-Rabbi Eliezer taught that all the nations came to Joseph to purchase food and Joseph understood their languages and spoke to each people in their own tongue. Therefore, he was called Turgeman (interpreter), as  says, "For Joseph understood them, for there was an interpreter between them."

Genesis chapter 43

The Gemara told that all through the 40 years that the Israelites wandered in the wilderness, Judah's bones were jolted about in their coffin until Moses asked God for mercy on Judah's behalf and to annul Judah's vow.

Rabbi Ḥiyya the Elder met a Babylonian in the Land of Israel and asked him about the welfare of Rabbi Ḥiyya's father in Babylon. The Babylonian replied that Rabbi Ḥiyya's mother in Babylon had asked about Rabbi Ḥiyya. Rabbi Ḥiyya exclaimed that he asked one thing and the Babylonian spoke to him of another. The Babylonian replied that people ask about the living, but not about the dead (hinting that Rabbi Ḥiyya's father had died). When  reports, "And they said: 'Your servant our father is well, he is yet alive, the Midrash interpreted the brothers to imply that Isaac had died.

Rav Judah taught that three things shorten a person's years: (1) to be given a Torah scroll from which to read and to refuse, (2) to be given a cup of benediction over which to say grace and to refuse, and (3) to assume airs of authority.

Joseph then asked Benjamin whether he had a brother. Benjamin replied that he had a brother, but did not know where he had gone. Joseph asked Benjamin whether he had wife. Benjamin replied that he had a wife and ten sons. Joseph asked what their names were. The name Bela signified that Benjamin's brother was swallowed up (nit-bala) from him; Becher signified that he was a firstborn (bechor); Ashbel signified that he was taken away captive (nishbah); Gera signified that he became a stranger (ger) in a strange country; Naaman signified that his actions were seemly (na'im) and pleasant (ne'im-im); Ehi signified that he indeed was "my brother" (ahi); Rosh signified that he was Benjamin's superior (rosh); Muppim signified that he was exceedingly attractive (yafeh ‘ad me'od) in all matters; and Huppim signified that Benjamin did not see his marriage-canopy (huppah) and he did not see Benjamin's; and Ard signified that he was like a rose-bloom (ward).

Rabbi Melai taught in the name of Rabbi Isaac of Magdala that from the day that Joseph departed from his brothers he abstained from wine, reading  to report, "The blessings of your father ... shall be on the head of Joseph, and on the crown of the head of him who was a nazirite (since his departure) from his brethren." Rabbi Jose ben Haninah taught that the brothers also abstained from wine after they departed from him, for  reports, "And they drank, and were merry with him", implying that they broke their abstention "with him". But Rabbi Melai taught that the brothers did drink wine in moderation since their separation from Joseph, and only when reunited with Joseph did they drink to intoxication "with him".

Genesis chapter 44
A Tanna taught that in  Joseph told his brethren not to take big strides and bring the sun into the city. For a Master taught that big strides rob a person of one five-hundredth part of that person's eyesight. And on bringing the sun into the city, Rav Judah said in the name of Rav that one should always leave a city by daylight and enter a city by daylight, as  reports that Joseph delayed until daylight to send his brothers away.

Rabbi Ishmael cited  as one of ten a fortiori (kal va-chomer) arguments recorded in the Hebrew Bible: (1) In , Joseph's brothers told Joseph, "Behold, the money that we found in our sacks' mouths we brought back to you", and they thus reasoned, "how then should we steal?" (2) In , Moses told God, "Behold, the children of Israel have not hearkened to me", and reasoned that surely all the more, "How then shall Pharaoh hear me?" (3) In , Moses said to the Israelites, "Behold, while I am yet alive with you this day, you have been rebellious against the Lord", and reasoned that it would follow, "And how much more after my death?" (4) In , "the Lord said to Moses: 'If her (Miriam's) father had but spit in her face, surely it would stand to reason, Should she not hide in shame seven days? (5) In , the prophet asked, "If you have run with the footmen, and they have wearied you", is it not logical to conclude, "Then how can you contend with horses?" (6) In 1 Samuel , David's men said to him, "Behold, we are afraid here in Judah", and thus surely it stands to reason, "How much more then if we go to Keilah?" (8)  reasoned, "Behold, the righteous shall be requited in the earth", and does it not follow, "How much more the wicked and the sinner?" (9) In , "The king said to Esther the queen: 'The Jews have slain and destroyed 500 men in Shushan the castle, and it thus stands to reason, What then have they done in the rest of the king's provinces? (10) In , God came to the prophet saying, "Behold, when it was whole, it was usable for no work", and thus surely it is logical to argue, "How much less, when the fire has devoured it, and it is singed?"

And by virtue of receiving those unwarranted blows between his shoulders, Benjamin's descendants merited having the Divine Presence rest between his shoulders and the Temple rest in Jerusalem, as  reports, "He dwells between his shoulders".

Rabbi Judah ben Ilai taught that Scripture speaks in praise of Judah.

Rav Naḥman bar Isaac read the word , NiZTaDaK, "can we show innocence", as an acronym for: We are honest (Nekonim), we are righteous (Zaddikim), we are pure (Tehorim), we are submissive (Dakkim), we are holy (Kedoshim).

Rabbi Levi said like one who drains (mizuy) a barrel of wine, leaving only its lees (God punished them to the last drop).

As  reports that "Joseph died, and all his brethren", the Rabbis concluded that Joseph died before his brothers. Rabbi Judah haNasi taught that Joseph died before his brothers because Joseph "commanded his servants the physicians to embalm his father" (as  reports). But the Rabbis taught that Jacob had directed his sons to embalm him, as  reports that "his sons did to him as he commanded them".

In medieval Jewish interpretation
The parashah is discussed in these medieval Jewish sources:

Genesis chapter 41
The Zohar taught that a dream is a sixtieth part of prophecy, and so forms the sixth grade removed from prophecy, which is the grade of Gabriel, the supervisor of dreams. The Zohar taught that as a normal dream proceeds from that grade, there is not a dream that is not intermingled with it some spurious matter, so that it is a mixture of truth and falsehood. Hence, all dreams follow their interpretation, as  says, "And it came to pass, as he interpreted to us, so it was", for since the dream contains both truth and falsehood, the word has power over it, and therefore it is advisable that every dream should be interpreted sensibly.

Thus he saw that the river would rise so slightly that there would be no plowing, and the little that would be planted would be burned because (in the words of ) "an east wind shall come, the wind of the Lord coming up from the wilderness", and thus he saw (in the words of ) "ears [of corn], thin and blasted with the east wind".

Reading , "And he gathered up all the food", Abraham ibn Ezra argued that one cannot read the word "all" literally, for if Joseph had taken all the food, then the Egyptians would have starved to death. Rather, Ibn Ezra argued that Joseph gathered as much of the food as he could without causing starvation.

Naḥmanides, however, disagreed, arguing that Joseph took control of all the food in Egypt and distributed quantities to the Egyptian people each year in accordance with their needs for sustenance. Joseph centralized the distribution of food so that people would not waste it. Naḥmanides noted that it is unclear whether Joseph paid money for the food from the royal treasury at a low price or Pharaoh took the food by force.

Genesis chapter 42
Maimonides argued that were God to live as life is usually conceived, there would be more than one god – God and God's life – and this is not so. Maimonides taught that it is beyond human capacity to relate or to grasp this matter in its entirety. This shows that God and God's life are not two separate things, as are the lives of living beings.

Genesis chapter 43
Similarly, Menaḥem ben Shlomo taught that the words "your God" signified that it was a reward for their fearing God, while the words "the God of your fathers" signified that it was a reward for Jacob's fearing God. Rashbam, however, read  to report that everyone knew that the brothers regularly benefitted from miracles. And David Kimhi (RaDaK) interpreted the steward to mean that if the brothers found the money in their sacks, it was a gift from heaven, comparable to if a human being had given them a treasure.

In modern interpretation
The parashah is discussed in these modern sources:

Genesis chapters 37–50
Donald Seybold schematized the Joseph narrative in the chart below, finding analogous relationships in each of Joseph's households.

Ephraim Speiser argued that in spite of its surface unity, the Joseph story, on closer scrutiny, yields two parallel strands similar in general outline, yet markedly different in detail. The Jahwist's version employed the Tetragrammaton and the name "Israel". In that version, Judah persuaded his brothers not to kill Joseph but sell him instead to Ishmaelites, who disposed of him in Egypt to an unnamed official. Joseph's new master promoted him to the position of chief retainer. When the brothers were on their way home from their first mission to Egypt with grain, they opened their bags at a night stop and were shocked to find the payment for their purchases. Judah persuaded his father to let Benjamin accompany them on a second journey to Egypt. Judah finally convinced Joseph that the brothers had really reformed. Joseph invited Israel to settle with his family in Goshen. The Elohist’s parallel account, in contrast, consistently used the names "Elohim" and "Jacob". Reuben – not Judah – saved Joseph from his brothers; Joseph was left in an empty cistern, where he was picked up, unknown to the brothers, by Midianites; they – not the Ishmaelites – sold Joseph as a slave to an Egyptian named Potiphar. In that lowly position, Joseph served – not supervised – the other prisoners. The brothers opened their sacks – not bags – at home in Canaan – not at an encampment along the way. Reuben – not Judah – gave Jacob – not Israel – his personal guarantee of Benjamin's safe return. Pharaoh – not Joseph – invited Jacob and his family to settle in Egypt – not just Goshen. Speiser concluded that the Joseph story can thus be traced back to two once separate, though now intertwined, accounts.

John Kselman noted that as in the Jacob cycle that precedes it, the Joseph narrative begins with the deception of a father by his offspring through an article of clothing; the deception leads to the separation of brothers for 20 years; and the climax of the story comes with the reconciliation of estranged brothers and the abatement of family strife. Kselman reported that recent scholarship points to authorship of the Joseph narrative in the Solomonic era, citing Solomon's marriage to Pharaoh's daughter (reported in ) as indicative of that era as one of amicable political and commercial relations between Egypt and Israel, thus explaining the positive attitude of the Joseph narrative to Egypt, Pharaoh, and Egyptians. Kselman argued that the Joseph narrative was thus not part of the Jahwist's work, but an independent literary work.

Gary Rendsburg noted that Genesis often repeats the motif of the younger son. Rendsburg explained Genesis's interest with this motif by recalling that David was the youngest of Jesse’s seven sons (see ), and Solomon was among the youngest, if not the youngest, of David’s sons (see ). The issue of who among David's many sons would succeed him dominates the Succession Narrative in  through . The two remaining candidates were Adonijah (David’s fourth son) and Solomon, and although Adonijah was older (and once claimed the throne when David was old and feeble in ), Solomon won out. Rendsburg argued that even though firstborn royal succession was the norm in the ancient Near East, the authors of Genesis justified Solomonic rule by imbedding the notion of ultimogeniture into Genesis's national epic. An Israelite could thus not criticize David’s selection of Solomon to succeed him as king over Israel, because Genesis reported that God had favored younger sons since Abel and blessed younger sons of Israel – Isaac, Jacob, Judah, Joseph, Perez, and Ephraim – since the inception of the covenant. More generally, Rendsburg concluded that royal scribes living in Jerusalem during the reigns of David and Solomon in the tenth century BCE were responsible for Genesis; their ultimate goal was to justify the monarchy in general, and the kingship of David and Solomon in particular; and Genesis thus appears as a piece of political propaganda.

Calling it "too good a story", James Kugel reported that modern interpreters contrast the full-fledged tale of the Joseph story with the schematic narratives of other Genesis figures and conclude that the Joseph story reads more like a work of fiction than history. Donald Redford and other scholars following him suspected that behind the Joseph story stood an altogether invented Egyptian or Canaanite tale that was popular on its own before an editor changed the main characters to Jacob and his sons. These scholars argue that the original story told of a family of brothers in which the father spoiled the youngest, and the oldest brother, who had his own privileged status, intervened to try to save the youngest when his other brothers threatened him. Scholars theorize that when the editor first mechanically put Reuben in the role of the oldest, but as the tribe of Reuben had virtually disappeared and the audience for the story were principally descendants of Judah, Judah was given the role of spokesman and hero in the end.

Von Rad and scholars following him noted that the Joseph story bears the particular signatures of ancient Near Eastern wisdom literature. Joseph is the only one of Israel's ancestors whom the Torah (in ) calls "wise" (chacham) – the same word as "sage" in Hebrew. Specialties of ancient Near Eastern sages included advising the king and interpreting dreams and other signs – just as Joseph did. Joseph displayed the cardinal sagely virtue of patience, which sages had because they believed that everything happens according to the Divine plan and would turn out for the best. Joseph thus looks like the model of an ancient Near Eastern sage, and the Joseph story looks like a didactic tale designed to teach the basic ideology of wisdom.

George Coats argued that the Joseph narrative is a literary device constructed to carry the children of Israel from Canaan to Egypt, to link preexisting stories of ancestral promises in Canaan to an Exodus narrative of oppression in and liberation from Egypt. Coats described the two principal goals of the Joseph story as (1) to describe reconciliation in a broken family despite the lack of merit of any of its members, and (2) to describe the characteristics of an ideal administrator.

Genesis chapter 41
Its theological relevance is, among other elements, in that Joseph is called "king of the people" "foster father" or – more literally – "nourisher of Egyptians" and "savior", while there occurred many times the phrases "the God of Joseph" and "Joseph remembering Jacob", emphasizing the ancestral role of his forefathers and not to have since lent support to different traditions. The History of Joseph is also related with Joseph and Aseneth and the Testament of the Twelve Patriarchs. In Joseph and Aseneth, Joseph is again referred as "king" (basileus), "giver of grain" (sinodotēs) and "savior" (sōter), in the same line of text (25:6), whereas the central theme of the Testament of the Twelve Patriarchs is "Joseph remembering Jacob", "while recounting the temptation by the wife of Potiphar".

Genesis chapter 43
Nahum Sarna wrote that the steward's reassuring reply was intelligible only on the assumption that he was privy to Joseph's scheme. His purpose was to lull the brothers into a false sense of relief. Robert Alter wrote that the steward dismissed the brothers' fears by introducing a kind of fairy tale explanation for the silver that they found in their bags. But Jon Levenson wrote that the steward sensed the hand of a beneficent Providence in the strange events.

Genesis chapter 44
Speiser argued that the Jahwist was not concerned in the main with the poetic justice of Joseph's triumph over his brothers, or Joseph's magnanimity in forgiving them for tormenting him. Speiser thought that the Jahwist's interest reached much deeper to Joseph's gnawing doubts over whether his brothers had morally regenerated in the intervening years. To find the answer, Joseph resorted to an elaborate test, using his full brother Benjamin as bait in a trap. When Judah offered himself as a substitute, Joseph got his answer that the brothers had indeed reformed.

Genesis chapter 45
Calling this either providence or predestination, Brueggemann argued that God thus worked out God's purpose through and in spite of Egypt, and through and in spite of Joseph and his brothers.

In critical analysis
Some scholars who follow the documentary hypothesis find evidence of four separate sources in the parashah. Thus some scholars consider the bulk of chapters  (with some minor exceptions inserted by the Elohist, sometimes abbreviated E) to have been composed by the Jahwist (sometimes abbreviated J) who wrote possibly as early as the 10th century BCE. For a similar distribution of verses, see the display of Genesis according to the Documentary Hypothesis at Wikiversity.

Commandments
According to Maimonides and Sefer ha-Chinuch, there are no commandments in the parashah.

Haftarah
A haftarah is a text selected from the books of Nevi'im ("The Prophets") that is read publicly in the synagogue after the reading of the Torah on Sabbath and holiday mornings. The haftarah usually has a thematic link to the Torah reading that precedes it. The text read following Parashat Miketz varies according to different traditions within Judaism.

Generally
It is the story of King Solomon and the two women, one with a dead baby and one with a live baby. Joseph's rule of Egypt "becomes a precursor to wise Solomon's reign". Gregory Goswell argues that "in both cases it is wisdom that equips a man to exercise authority".

On Shabbat Chanukah
Additionally, when Parashat Miketz occurs on Rosh Chodesh (as it did in 2015 and 2019), some congregations read additional verses in honor of the new month. (The month of Tevet always begins during Chanukah.)

Notes

Further reading
The parashah has parallels or is discussed in these sources:

Ancient
Epic of Gilgamesh 6:92-113 Mesopotamia, 14th–11th century BCE. In, e.g., James B. Pritchard, Ancient Near Eastern Texts Relating to the Old Testament, pages 84–85. Princeton: Princeton University Press, 1969. (Bull of Heaven and seven years of famine).

Biblical
 (improvident oath).
 (improvident oath).
;  (interpreting dreams).

Early nonrabbinic
Philo the Epic Poet. On Jerusalem. Fragment 3. 3rd–2nd century BCE. Quoted in Eusebius. Preparation for the Gospel. 9:24:1. Translated by H. Attridge. In The Old Testament Pseudepigrapha: Volume 2: Expansions of the "Old Testament" and Legends, Wisdom and Philosophical Literature, Prayers, Psalms, and Odes, Fragments of Lost Judeo-Hellenistic works. Edited by James H. Charlesworth, pages 783–84. New York: Anchor Bible, 1985. (Joseph in Egypt).
Josephus. Antiquities 2:5:4–6:8. Circa 93–94. In, e.g., The Works of Josephus: Complete and Unabridged, New Updated Edition. Translated by William Whiston. Peabody, Massachusetts: Hendrickson Publishers, 1987.
Joseph and Aseneth 1st century BCE. – 2nd century CE. In, e.g., James H. Charlesworth, The Old Testament Pseudepigrapha, volume 2, pages 177–247. New York: Doubleday, 1985.
Qur'an 12:43–79. Arabia, 7th century.

Classical rabbinic
Jerusalem Talmud: Berakhot 4b, 60a, 75b; Kilayim 72b; Maaser Sheni 45a; Shabbat 24a, 48a; Taanit 7b; Megillah 37a; Chagigah 5a; Yevamot 1b, 4b, 47b; Sanhedrin 11a; Horayot 17b. Tiberias, Land of Israel, circa 400 CE. In, e.g., Talmud Yerushalmi. Edited by Chaim Malinowitz, Yisroel Simcha Schorr, and Mordechai Marcus, volumes 1–2, 5, 10, 13–14, 25–27, 29–30, 44, 49. Brooklyn: Mesorah Publications, 2005–2019. And in, e.g., The Jerusalem Talmud: A Translation and Commentary. Edited by Jacob Neusner and translated by Jacob Neusner, Tzvee Zahavy, B. Barry Levy, and Edward Goldman. Peabody, Massachusetts: Hendrickson Publishers, 2009.
Genesis Rabbah 31:12; 34:7; 69:3; 84:16–17; 89:1–92:9; 93:7; 100:3. Land of Israel, 5th century. In, e.g., Midrash Rabbah: Genesis. Translated by Harry Freedman and Maurice Simon, volume 2, pages 820–856. London: Soncino Press, 1939.

Babylonian Talmud: Berakhot 10b, 55a–b, 56b, 57b; 105a, 139a; Pesachim 2a, 7b; Taanit 9a, 10b, 11a; Megillah 13b; Yevamot 17b, 22a, 88a; Ketubot 27b, 30a; Nazir 5a; Sotah 13b, 36b; Bava Metzia 39a–b, 53b; Bava Batra 4a, 15a, 173b; Sanhedrin 63b, 92a, 112b; Makkot 11a–b, 19b; Chullin 85a, 91a, 95b. Sasanian Empire, 6th century. In, e.g., Talmud Bavli. Edited by Yisroel Simcha Schorr, Chaim Malinowitz, and Mordechai Marcus, 72 volumes. Brooklyn: Mesorah Publications, 2006.
Avot of Rabbi Natan, chapter 41. Circa 700–900 CE. In, e.g., Judah Goldin, translator, The Fathers According to Rabbi Nathan, page 172. New Haven: Yale University Press, 1955.

Medieval
Rashi. Commentary. Genesis 41–44. Troyes, France, late 11th century. In, e.g., Rashi. The Torah: With Rashi's Commentary Translated, Annotated, and Elucidated. Translated and annotated by Yisrael Isser Zvi Herczeg, 1:447–491. Brooklyn: Mesorah Publications, 1995.

Rashbam. Commentary on the Torah. Troyes, early 12th century. In, e.g., Rabbi Samuel Ben Meir's Commentary on Genesis: An Annotated Translation. Translated by Martin I. Lockshin, pages 278–310. Lewiston, New York: The Edwin Mellen Press, 1989.
Judah Halevi. Kuzari. 4:15. Toledo, Spain, 1130–1140. In, e.g., Jehuda Halevi. Kuzari: An Argument for the Faith of Israel. Introduction by Henry Slonimsky, page 221. New York: Schocken, 1964.
Abraham ibn Ezra. Commentary on the Torah. Mid-12th century. In, e.g., Ibn Ezra's Commentary on the Pentateuch: Genesis (Bereshit). Translated and annotated by H. Norman Strickman and Arthur M. Silver, pages 372–96. New York: Menorah Publishing Company, 1988.

Maimonides. Mishneh Torah: Hilchot Yesodei HaTorah (The Laws that Are the Foundations of the Torah), chapter 2, halachah 10. Egypt, circa 1170–1180. In, e.g., Mishneh Torah: Hilchot Yesodei HaTorah: The Laws [which Are] the Foundations of the Torah. Translated by Eliyahu Touger, volume 1. New York: Moznaim Publishing, 1989.
Maimonides. Mishneh Torah: Hilchot Ta'aniyot (The Laws of Fasts), chapter 1, halachah 15; chapter 3, halachah 8. Egypt, circa 1170–1180. In, e.g., Mishneh Torah: Hilchot Eruvin: The Laws of Eruvin: and Hilchot Sh’vitat Asor: The Laws of Resting on the Tenth (Day of Tishrei): and Hilchot Sh’vitat Yom Tov: The Laws of Resting on the Holidays). Translated by Eliyahu Touger, volume 11. New York: Moznaim Publishing, 1993.
Hezekiah ben Manoah. Hizkuni. France, circa 1240. In, e.g., Chizkiyahu ben Manoach. Chizkuni: Torah Commentary. Translated and annotated by Eliyahu Munk, volume 1, pages 293–309. Jerusalem: Ktav Publishers, 2013.
Naḥmanides. Commentary on the Torah. Jerusalem, circa 1270. In, e.g., Ramban (Nachmanides): Commentary on the Torah: Genesis. Translated by Charles B. Chavel, volume 1, pages 493–528. New York: Shilo Publishing House, 1971.
Zohar volume 1, pages 25a, 145a, 175a, 183a, 193a–205a, 206a; volume 2, pages 198a; volume 3, pages 22b, 62b, 268a. Spain, late 13th century.
Isaac ben Moses Arama. Akedat Yizhak (The Binding of Isaac). Late 15th century. In, e.g., Yitzchak Arama. Akeydat Yitzchak: Commentary of Rabbi Yitzchak Arama on the Torah. Translated and condensed by Eliyahu Munk, volume 1, pages 253–70. New York, Lambda Publishers, 2001.

Modern
Isaac Abravanel. Commentary on the Torah. Italy, between 1492 and 1509. In, e.g., Abarbanel: Selected Commentaries on the Torah: Volume 1: Bereishis/Genesis. Translated and annotated by Israel Lazar, pages 278–352. Brooklyn: CreateSpace, 2015. And excerpted in, e.g., Abarbanel on the Torah: Selected Themes. Translated by Avner Tomaschoff, pages 322–344. Jerusalem: Jewish Agency for Israel, 2007.
Obadiah ben Jacob Sforno. Commentary on the Torah. Venice, 1567. In, e.g., Sforno: Commentary on the Torah. Translation and explanatory notes by Raphael Pelcovitz, pages 218–39. Brooklyn: Mesorah Publications, 1997.
Moshe Alshich. Commentary on the Torah. Safed, circa 1593. In, e.g., Moshe Alshich. Midrash of Rabbi Moshe Alshich on the Torah. Translated and annotated by Eliyahu Munk, volume 1, pages 265–94. New York, Lambda Publishers, 2000.

Avraham Yehoshua Heschel. Commentaries on the Torah. Cracow, Poland, mid 17th century. Compiled as Chanukat HaTorah. Edited by Chanoch Henoch Erzohn. Piotrkow, Poland, 1900. In Avraham Yehoshua Heschel. Chanukas HaTorah: Mystical Insights of Rav Avraham Yehoshua Heschel on Chumash. Translated by Avraham Peretz Friedman, pages 96–98. Southfield, Michigan: Targum Press/Feldheim Publishers, 2004.
Thomas Hobbes. Leviathan, 3:34. England, 1651. Reprint edited by C. B. Macpherson, page 431. Harmondsworth, England: Penguin Classics, 1982.
Chaim ibn Attar. Ohr ha-Chaim. Venice, 1742. In Chayim ben Attar. Or Hachayim: Commentary on the Torah. Translated by Eliyahu Munk, volume 1, pages 324–54. Brooklyn: Lambda Publishers, 1999.
Judah Leib Gordon. Osenath, Daughter of Potiphera. Vilna, Russia, 1868.
Samuel David Luzzatto (Shadal). Commentary on the Torah. Padua, 1871. In, e.g., Samuel David Luzzatto. Torah Commentary. Translated and annotated by Eliyahu Munk, volume 2, pages 393–431. New York: Lambda Publishers, 2012.
Yehudah Aryeh Leib Alter. Sefat Emet. Góra Kalwaria (Ger), Poland, before 1906. Excerpted in The Language of Truth: The Torah Commentary of Sefat Emet. Translated and interpreted by Arthur Green, pages 61–65. Philadelphia: Jewish Publication Society, 1998. Reprinted 2012.
Abraham Isaac Kook. The Lights of Penitence, 11:6. 1925. In Abraham Isaac Kook: the Lights of Penitence, the Moral Principles, Lights of Holiness, Essays, Letters, and Poems. Translated by Ben Zion Bokser, page 83. Mahwah, New Jersey: Paulist Press 1978.
Alexander Alan Steinbach. Sabbath Queen: Fifty-four Bible Talks to the Young Based on Each Portion of the Pentateuch, pages 30–32. New York: Behrman's Jewish Book House, 1936.

Irving Fineman. Jacob, An Autobiographical Novel. New York: Random House, 1941.
Thomas Mann. Joseph and His Brothers. Translated by John E. Woods, pages 257, 274–75, 526–27, 609, 672–74, 765, 788, 1007–1253, 1287–373. New York: Alfred A. Knopf, 2005. Originally published as Joseph und seine Brüder. Stockholm: Bermann-Fischer Verlag, 1943.
Walter Orenstein and Hertz Frankel. Torah and Tradition: A Bible Textbook for Jewish Youth: Volume I: Bereishis, pages 107–121. New York: Hebrew Publishing Company, 1964.
Gerhard von Rad. "The Joseph Narrative and Ancient Wisdom." In The Problem of the Hexateuch and Other Essays, pages 292–300. New York: McGraw-Hill, 1966.
Donald B. Redford. A Study of the Biblical Story of Joseph (Genesis 37–50). Boston: Brill Publishers, 1970.
George W. Coats. "The Joseph Story and Wisdom: a Reappraisal". Catholic Biblical Quarterly, volume 35 (1973): pages 285–297.
Eric I. Lowenthal. The Joseph Narrative in Genesis, pages 47–96. Ktav, 1973.
George W. Coats. "Redactional Unity in Genesis 37–50". Journal of Biblical Literature, volume 93 (1974): pages 15–21.
Donald A. Seybold. "Paradox and Symmetry in the Joseph Narrative". In Literary Interpretations of Biblical Narratives. Edited by Kenneth R. R. Gros Louis, with James S. Ackerman and Thayer S. Warshaw, pages 59–73. Nashville: Abingdon, 1974.
George W. Coats. From Canaan to Egypt: Structural and Theological Context for the Joseph Story. Washington, D.C.: Catholic Biblical Association, 1976.
Seän M. Warner. "The Patriarchs and Extra-Biblical Sources". Journal for the Study of the Old Testament, volume 1, number 2 (June 1976): pages 50–61.
J. Maxwell Miller. "The Patriarchs and Extra-Biblical Sources: A Response". Journal for the Study of the Old Testament, volume 1, number 2 (June 1976): pages 62–66.
Peter D. Miscall. "The Jacob and Joseph Stories as Analogies". Journal for the Study of the Old Testament, volume 3, number 6 (April 1978): pages 28–40.
S. David Sperling. "Genesis 41:40: A New Interpretation". Journal of the Ancient Near Eastern Society, volume 10 (1978): pages 113–19.
Ivan Caine. "Numbers in the Joseph Narrative". In Jewish Civilization: Essays and Studies: Volume 1. Edited by Ronald A. Brauner, pages 3–17. Philadelphia: Reconstructionist Rabbinical College, 1979. .
Robert Alter. "Joseph and his Brothers". Commentary (November 1980).
Nehama Leibowitz. Studies in Bereshit (Genesis), pages 439–482. Jerusalem: The World Zionist Organization, 1981. Reprinted as New Studies in the Weekly Parasha. Lambda Publishers, 2010.
Walter Brueggemann. Genesis: Interpretation: A Bible Commentary for Teaching and Preaching, pages 325–342. Atlanta: John Knox Press, 1982.
Robert Sacks. "The Lion and the Ass: A Commentary on the Book of Genesis (Chapters 44–50)". Interpretation: A Journal of Political Philosophy, volume 12, numbers 2 and 3 (May and September 1984): pages 141–192.
Pinchas H. Peli. Torah Today: A Renewed Encounter with Scripture, pages 41–44. Washington, D.C.: B'nai B'rith Books, 1987.
Murray H. Lichtenstein. "Idiom, Rhetoric and the Text of Genesis 41:16". Journal of the Ancient Near Eastern Society, volume 19 (1989): pages 85–94.
Nahum M. Sarna. The JPS Torah Commentary: Genesis: The Traditional Hebrew Text with the New JPS Translation, pages 280–306. Philadelphia: Jewish Publication Society, 1989.
Lawrence M. Wills. Jew in the Court of the Foreign King: Ancient Jewish Court Legends. Fortress Press, 1990.
Arnold Ages. "Why Didn't Joseph Call Home?" Bible Review, volume 9, number 4) (August 1993).

Frederick Buechner. The Son of Laughter, pages 240–261. New York: HarperSanFrancisco, 1993.
Leon R. Kass. "Assimilation versus Separation, by Aaron Wildavsky: To assimilate or to stay apart?" Commentary. (September 1, 1993).
Aaron Wildavsky. Assimilation versus Separation: Joseph the Administrator and the Politics of Religion in Biblical Israel. New Brunswick, New Jersey: Transaction Publishers, 1993.
Judith S. Antonelli. "Asnat: Joseph's Wife". In In the Image of God: A Feminist Commentary on the Torah, pages 114–122. Northvale, New Jersey: Jason Aronson, 1995.
Naomi H. Rosenblatt and Joshua Horwitz. Wrestling With Angels: What Genesis Teaches Us About Our Spiritual Identity, Sexuality, and Personal Relationships, pages 341–362. Delacorte Press, 1995.
Avivah Gottlieb Zornberg. The Beginning of Desire: Reflections on Genesis, pages 284–313. New York: Image Books/Doubelday, 1995.

Ellen Frankel. The Five Books of Miriam: A Woman's Commentary on the Torah, pages 81–83. New York: G. P. Putnam's Sons, 1996.
W. Gunther Plaut. The Haftarah Commentary, pages 101–107. New York: UAHC Press, 1996.
Walter Wangerin, Jr. The Book of God: The Bible as a Novel, pages 86–98. Grand Rapids, Michigan: Zondervan, 1996.
Sorel Goldberg Loeb and Barbara Binder Kadden. Teaching Torah: A Treasury of Insights and Activities, pages 65–70. Denver: A.R.E. Publishing, 1997.
Susan Freeman. Teaching Jewish Virtues: Sacred Sources and Arts Activities, pages 165–178. Springfield, New Jersey: A.R.E. Publishing, 1999..

Israel Finkelstein and Neil Asher Silberman. "Searching for the Patriarchs". In The Bible Unearthed: Archaeology's New Vision of Ancient Israel and the Origin of Its Sacred Texts, pages 27–47. New York: The Free Press, 2001.
Lainie Blum Cogan and Judy Weiss. Teaching Haftarah: Background, Insights, and Strategies, pages 118–126. Denver: A.R.E. Publishing, 2002.
Michael Fishbane. The JPS Bible Commentary: Haftarot, pages 67–71. Philadelphia: Jewish Publication Society, 2002.
Leon R. Kass. The Beginning of Wisdom: Reading Genesis, pages 561–593. New York: Free Press, 2003.
Robert Alter. The Five Books of Moses: A Translation with Commentary, pages 230–256. New York: W. W. Norton & Co., 2004.
Jon D. Levenson. "Genesis". In The Jewish Study Bible. Edited by Adele Berlin and Marc Zvi Brettler, pages 81–88. New York: Oxford University Press, 2004.
John Van Seters. "The Joseph Story: Some Basic Observations". In Egypt, Israel, and the Ancient Mediterranean World: Studies in Honor of Donald B. Redford. Edited by Gary N. Knoppers and Antoine Hirsch. Boston: Brill Publishers, 2004.
Professors on the Parashah: Studies on the Weekly Torah Reading. Edited by Leib Moscovitz, pages 71–76. Jerusalem: Urim Publications, 2005.
W. Gunther Plaut. The Torah: A Modern Commentary: Revised Edition. Revised edition edited by David E.S. Stern, pages 267–285. New York: Union for Reform Judaism, 2006.
Nili Shupak. "A Fresh Look at the Dreams of the Officials and of Pharaoh in the Story of Joseph (Genesis 40–41) in the Light of Egyptian Dreams". Journal of the Ancient Near Eastern Society, volume 30 (2006): pages 103–138.
Suzanne A. Brody. "Incubus". In Dancing in the White Spaces: The Yearly Torah Cycle and More Poems, page 72. Shelbyville, Kentucky: Wasteland Press, 2007.
Lisbeth S. Fried. "Why Did Joseph Shave?" Biblical Archaeology Review, volume 33, number 4 (July/August 2007): pages 36–41.
Shmuel Goldin. Unlocking the Torah Text: Bereishit, pages 225–39. Jerusalem: Gefen Publishing House, 2007.
James L. Kugel. How To Read the Bible: A Guide to Scripture, Then and Now, pages 176–97. New York: Free Press, 2007.
The Torah: A Women's Commentary. Edited by Tamara Cohn Eskenazi and Andrea L. Weiss, pages 233–258. New York: URJ Press, 2008.
Reuven Hammer. Entering Torah: Prefaces to the Weekly Torah Portion, pages 57–61. New York: Gefen Publishing House, 2009.
Dawn Rose. "Yusuf Come Home: Parashat Miketz (Genesis 41:1–44:17)". In Torah Queeries: Weekly Commentaries on the Hebrew Bible. Edited by Gregg Drinkwater, Joshua Lesser, and David Shneer; foreword by Judith Plaskow, pages 60–63. New York: New York University Press, 2009.

Jonathan Sacks. Covenant & Conversation: A Weekly Reading of the Jewish Bible: Genesis: The Book of Beginnings, pages 271–300. New Milford, Connecticut: Maggid Books, 2009.
Carolyn J. Sharp. Am I in the Place of God?': Joseph the Pretender". In Irony and Meaning in the Hebrew Bible, pages 54–61. Bloomington, Indiana: Indiana University Press, 2009.
John H. Walton. "Genesis". In Zondervan Illustrated Bible Backgrounds Commentary. Edited by John H. Walton, volume 1, pages 129–133. Grand Rapids, Michigan: Zondervan, 2009.
Bradford A. Anderson. "The Inversion of the Birth Order and the Title of the Firstborn". Vetus Testamentum, volume 60, number 4 (2010): pages 655–658.

Anna Patricio. Asenath. Imajin Books, 2011.
Calum Carmichael. The Book of Numbers: A Critique of Genesis, pages 9, 21, 23, 46–48, 55, 59, 61–63, 65, 69, 74–76, 80, 95–97, 171. New Haven: Yale University Press, 2012.
Shmuel Herzfeld. "The Miracle of Overflowing Oil". In Fifty-Four Pick Up: Fifteen-Minute Inspirational Torah Lessons, pages 52–58. Jerusalem: Gefen Publishing House, 2012.
Hillel I. Millgram. The Joseph Paradox: A Radical Reading of Genesis 37–50. Jefferson, North Carolina: McFarland and Company, 2012.

Eve Woogen. "The Best of Stories: Yusuf as Joseph in Hebrew Translations of the Qur'an". Classics Honors Projects. (2012).
Dara Horn. A Guide for the Perplexed. New York: W. W. Norton & Company, 2013 (novel retelling the Joseph story).
Philip Y. Yoo. "Why Does Joseph Wash his Face?" Journal for the Study of the Old Testament, volume 38, number 1 (September 2013): pages 3–14.
Atar Hadari. "The Crucial Contrast Between Joseph and Moses: Moses acts, while Joseph sees himself as being acted upon". Mosaic Magazine. (December 11, 2015).
Jonathan Sacks. Lessons in Leadership: A Weekly Reading of the Jewish Bible, pages 47–50. New Milford, Connecticut: Maggid Books, 2015.
Katie M. Heffelfinger. "From Bane to Blessing: The Food Leitmotif in Genesis 37–50". Journal for the Study of the Old Testament, volume 40, number 3 (March 2016): pages 297–320.
Jean-Pierre Isbouts. Archaeology of the Bible: The Greatest Discoveries From Genesis to the Roman Era, pages 76–83. Washington, D.C.: National Geographic, 2016.
Jonathan Sacks. Essays on Ethics: A Weekly Reading of the Jewish Bible, pages 59–63. New Milford, Connecticut: Maggid Books, 2016.
Shai Held. The Heart of Torah, Volume 1: Essays on the Weekly Torah Portion: Genesis and Exodus, pages 88–98. Philadelphia: Jewish Publication Society, 2017.
James L. Kugel. The Great Shift: Encountering God in Biblical Times, pages 22, 34, 204, 350–51. Boston: Houghton Mifflin Harcourt, 2017.
Steven Levy and Sarah Levy. The JPS Rashi Discussion Torah Commentary, pages 30–32. Philadelphia: Jewish Publication Society, 2017.

Jeffrey K. Salkin. The JPS B'nai Mitzvah Torah Commentary, pages 43–48. Philadelphia: Jewish Publication Society, 2017.
Andrew Tobolowsky. "The Problem of Reubenite Primacy: New Paradigms, New Answers". Journal of Biblical Literature, volume 139, number 1 (2020): pages 27–45.
Liana Finck. Let There Be Light: The Real Story of Her Creation, pages 295–313. New York: Random House, 2022.

External links

Texts
Masoretic text and 1917 JPS translation
Hear the parashah chanted
Hear the parashah read in Hebrew

Commentaries

Academy for Jewish Religion, California
Academy for Jewish Religion, New York
Aish.com
Akhlah: The Jewish Children's Learning Network
Aleph Beta Academy
American Jewish University—Ziegler School of Rabbinic Studies
Anshe Emes Synagogue, Los Angeles
Ari Goldwag
Ascent of Safed
Bar-Ilan University
Chabad.org
eparsha.com
G-dcast
The Israel Koschitzky Virtual Beit Midrash
Jewish Agency for Israel
Jewish Theological Seminary
Kabbala Online
Mechon Hadar
MyJewishLearning.com
Ohr Sameach
Orthodox Union
OzTorah, Torah from Australia
Oz Ve Shalom—Netivot Shalom
Pardes from Jerusalem
Professor James L. Kugel
Rabbi Dov Linzer
Rabbi Fabian Werbin
Rabbi Jonathan Sacks
Rabbi Shlomo Riskin
Rabbi Shmuel Herzfeld
Rabbi Stan Levin
Reconstructionist Judaism 
Sephardic Institute
Shiur.com
613.org Jewish Torah Audio
Tanach Study Center
TheTorah.com
Torah from Dixie
Torah.org
TorahVort.com
Union for Reform Judaism
United Synagogue of Conservative Judaism
What's Bothering Rashi?
Yeshivat Chovevei Torah
Yeshiva University

Weekly Torah readings in Kislev
Weekly Torah readings from Genesis